Mastek is an Indian multinational technology company that offers enterprise level digital transformation services and software for large public and private enterprises in the UK, US, and India. Mastek has more than 5,800 employees across the 11 offices in the UK, US and India. The company is listed on the National Stock Exchange of India Limited under the symbol MASTEK and BSE under the 523704.()

History

Founded (1982) 

Mastek was incorporated on 14 May 1982 as Management and Software Technology Private Limited, a business designing and delivering computer software. The name was changed to Mastek on 16 August 1992.

The company was founded by three Indian Institute of Management Ahmedabad class of 1979 batch-mates including Ashank Desai, Ketan Mehta and R. Sundar. They were later joined by Sudhakar Ram who held the role of Group CEO of the company until late 2016 when John Owen joined the business and took over as the Group CEO. Sudhakar Ram now operates as the Vice Chairman and Managing Director of the Mastek Group.

IPO and International Expansion (1992)
In 1992 Mastek acquired Carter Cast Systems, an IT company as part of the plan to establish the Mastek footprint in the UK and set up base in Theale.

In 1995 Capita engaged Mastek to bid for the London Congestion Charging scheme. The scheme went live as planned, on 17 February 2003. In 2003 BT Global Services invited Mastek to join the consortium, for the Spine programme. Mastek was involved in delivering and maintaining several applications for the NHS Spine over the next decade – involving over 130 deliveries during the project phase.

Majesco, the U.S. subsidiary of global technology service provider Mastek was founded in 1992. In 2005, the firm acquired Entegram LLC, a Connecticut-based software company. In 2007, it acquired Vector Insurance Services a technology service provider and third-party administrator that focuses on the North American life and annuity insurance industry. Systems Task Group (STG) an IP-based enterprise service provider to the North American property and casualty (P&C) insurance industry was acquired in 2008. In 2009, MajescoMastek entered the Canadian Market. SEG Software, LLC, a provider of policy administration systems covering individual and group life, health & annuity insurance products was acquired in 2010.

In 2014, MajescoMastek demerged from Mastek consolidating all of its insurance business internationally under the new brand, Majesco. In December 2014, the firm announced the signing of an agreement to merge the business of Cover-All Technologies (NYSE MKT: COVR) with Majesco. In February 2015 Majesco acquired the consulting firm Agile Technologies.

In 2006, Forbes Asia ranked Mastek amongst the World's 200 Best Small and Medium-sized Enterprises, all under Dollar 1 billion in revenues.

In 2009 and 2010, Mastek Ranked amongst the Best 20 Leaders by The International Association of Outsourcing Professional (IAOP), in four industry focus areas a) Government, b) Financial Services Insurance, c) Financial Services Banking, and d) Information and Communication.

From 2006 to 2014, Mastek ranked amongst the Top 100 outsourcing companies in the World by The International Association of Outsourcing Professionals (IAOP)

Growth and acquisitions (2015–2018)

In 2015 Mastek acquired IndigoBlue a consultancy firm specialising in Agile programme management.

In 2016 Mastek acquired TAISTech a US-based digital commerce expert. TAISTech delivers products including Oracle Commerce (ATG) & Endeca, Oracle and Demandware, Marketing Cloud, Commercetools, CPQ (Configure Price Quote), Integration ESB Platforms, Open-Source technology, other Cloud Digital Transformation Services around Amazon, Oracle, Microsoft, and Google Cloud Platform.

The company reported net revenues of 832 Crores for FY2018 as compared to 572.8 Crores in FY17, reflecting a 46.3% increase. Operating revenue stood at 817.2 Crores for FY18 as compared to 560.2 Crores in FY17, indicating a 45.9% increase.

Initiatives

Mastek Foundation 
Founded in 2002, the Mastek Foundation is the Corporate and Social Responsibility (CSR) wing of Mastek and Majesco Ltd. Registered under the Bombay Public Trust Act, the Mastek Foundation encourages individuals, employees and corporate professionals to contribute to society. The Mastek Foundation mainly supports the promotion of education, health and nutrition, eradication of hunger, promotion of gender equality and protection of environment sustainability.

Project Deep Blue
Project Deep Blue was started in 2015 as a Mastek initiative to encourage engineering students to solve social problems using coding skills to come up with meaningful technical solutions over a course of three months. As a part of this competition, participating engineering graduates exercised their software and IT knowledge to solve real life problems from the social sector. Teams which make through the selection process further gain from working with latest cutting-edge technologies like neural nets, social data analytics, machine learning, advanced image processing and IoT for problem solving.

Mastek 4.0
Mastek 4.0 was designed to eliminate management layers and better enable employees to deliver a business impact to customers. There are now just three layers separating the CEO from the frontline developers and instead of a command and control based hierarchical structure, the entire company is organised as self-managed teams with the ability to set their own goals. Under the new organisational structure, the company also decided to do away with the traditional supervisory appraisal process and instituted a team based self-appraisal system incentivising the top performing teams.

Services

Application Development – Bespoke application development

Agile Consulting – Agile consulting and programme management

Business Intelligence & Analytics – Enterprise level data insight

Application Support & Maintenance – DevOps and agile service management

Assurance & Testing – Integrated software testing

Digital Commerce and Self-Service Portals – Omni-channel Services

Automation / Robotic Process Automation (RPA)

Cloud Migration and Digital Transformation

Integration Platforms / Enterprise Service Bus for MDM

Customer Experience – CPQ, Service, Sales, CRM, Content/CMS

Back-office Application Support – Oracle E-Business Suite, Oracle Cloud ERP, Oracle Taleo/HCM, Peoplesoft, SAP

Notable alumni
Sudhakar Ram, Founder

Ashank Desai, Founder

Ketan Mehta, Founder

Radhakrishnan Sundar, Founder

References

External links
 

Information technology companies of India
Software companies based in Mumbai
1982 establishments in Maharashtra
Technology companies established in 1982
Companies listed on the National Stock Exchange of India
Companies listed on the Bombay Stock Exchange